Sam Barlow High School is a public high school in Gresham, Oregon, United States, in the Gresham-Barlow School District. It was named after the Oregon pioneer Sam Barlow.

Teacher Stephen Corkett received the University of Oregon's high school teacher of the year award in 2009.

History
Sam Barlow High School opened in September 1968 in its present location at 302nd Street and Lusted Road, east of Gresham, Oregon.

On November 23, 2009, two students discussed plans for a school shooting at Barlow High on Myspace. They were found guilty of disorderly conduct in February 2010.

On October 5, 2017, around 11AM, a 911 call was reported about a potential shooting as they saw a student with a handgun. The school was under lockdown for 2 hours before being lifted at around 1PM. The incident has since been ruled a hoax.

Academics
In 2008, 75% of the school's seniors received a high school diploma. Of 419 students, 315 graduated, 74 dropped out, ten received a modified diploma, and 20 were still in high school the following year.

In 2013, 85% of the school's seniors received a high school diploma. Of 400 students, 340 graduated, 40 dropped out, six received a modified diploma, and 13 were still in high school the following year.

Barlow's students have been filling AP classes and passing AP exams at such a high rate that the College Board named the Gresham-Barlow School District to its fourth-annual Advanced Placement District Honor Roll. Just three districts in Oregon received the honor.

Sports

State championships
 Girls' volleyball: 1987, 1992, 1993, 1995, 1996
 Boys' track and field: 1999, 2008
 Boys' wrestling: 1980, 1981
 Girls' track and field: 1982, 2015
 Girls' water polo: 2018, 2021

Activities

State championships
 Band: 1994, 1995
 Speech: 1988, 1998, 2002, 2008, 2011

Notable alumni

 Brian Burres – Major League Baseball pitcher, Pittsburgh Pirates
 Ryan Crouser – athlete, gold medalist in shot put at the 2016 and 2020 Summer Olympics
 Mike Ekstrom – Major League Baseball pitcher, Tampa Bay Rays
 Dave Jansen – mixed martial arts fighter, Bellator
 Fred Jones – former National Basketball Association shooting guard
 Brent Knopf – singer, songwriter and musician in indie bands Menomena, Ramona Falls and EL VY
 Mike Pierce – professional mixed martial arts fighter, formerly competing in the UFC
 Oscar Wood – wrestler

References

High schools in Multnomah County, Oregon
Education in Gresham, Oregon
Public high schools in Oregon
Buildings and structures in Gresham, Oregon
1968 establishments in Oregon